Adam Richard Walker (born 22 January 1991) is an English footballer who plays as a midfielder.

Career
Walker made his professional debut for Coventry City on 28 December 2008 as a substitute in a 2–0 Football League Championship win against Sheffield Wednesday.

He made his second appearance in a 0–0 draw against Charlton Athletic at the Ricoh Arena.

Walker joined Nuneaton Town on loan on 28 October 2009, before joining them on a permanent deal on 1 April 2010 after being released by Coventry City.

After a successful term at Brackley Town, Walker joined National League North rivals AFC Telford United in May 2019 on a one year deal. 

Walker played for over three seasons at the Shropshire club, making over 75 appearances and eventually going on to become club captain. His contract was ended by mutual termination in January 2022, which lead to him joining Leamington FC on a permanent transfer on 26th January 2022.

Career statistics

Honours
Brackley Town
FA Trophy: 2017–18

References

External links
Adam Walker player profile at ccfc.co.uk

1991 births
Living people
English footballers
Association football midfielders
Coventry City F.C. players
Nuneaton Borough F.C. players
English Football League players
National League (English football) players
Solihull Moors F.C. players
Brackley Town F.C. players